W.A.K.O. World Championships 2005 in Szeged were the joint fifteenth world championships held by the W.A.K.O. organization and the third ever to be held in Hungary - with the other event having been held a couple of months earlier in Agadir, Morocco.  The championships in Szeged were open to amateur men and women from across the world with around 720 athletes from 48 countries across five continents taking part.

There were four styles on offer at Szeged; Full-Contact, Light-Contact, Semi-Contact and Aero-Kickboxing.  The other styles (Low-Kick, Thai-Boxing and Musical Forms) were held at the Agadir event.  By the end of the championships, Russia were the strongest nation overall, followed closely by hosts Hungary, with Italy in third place.  The event was held at the Városi Sportcsarnok in Szeged, Hungary on Monday, 28 November to Monday, 5 December 2005 in front of a crowd of around 4,000.

Participating nations

There were around 48 nations from five continents across the world participating at the 2005 W.A.K.O. World Championships in Szeged including:

Full-Contact

Full-Contact is a form of kickboxing where the contestants are allowed to throw punches and kicks at full force at legal targets above the waist.  Victories are usually achieved via a point's decision or referee stoppage (e.g. KO/TKO) and as with most other forms of amateur kickboxing, all participants must wear the required head and body protection.  More information on Full-Contact kickboxing and the rules can be found on the official W.A.K.O. website.  Both men and women had competitions at Szegad, with the men having twelve weight divisions ranging from 51 kg/112.2 lbs to over 91 kg/+200.2 lbs and the women seven, ranging from 48 kg/105.6 lbs to over 70 kg/+143 lbs.

Despite there not being as many familiar faces taking part in the style as in the past, there were a number of double winners who had won at the last European championships in Budva, with Zurab Faroyan and Daniel Martins picking up gold medals.  There were also several winners who had won at the 2003 world championships in Paris with Jere Reinikainen and Karolina Lukasik winning gold, while Igor Kulbaev did even better by picking up his third gold medal in a row at a W.A.K.O. championships having also won at Budva and Paris.  Regular leaders Russia were once again the top nation in Full-Contact, winning six gold, four silver and five bronze medals in both the male and female categories.

Men's Full-Contact Kickboxing Medals Table

Women's Full-Contact Kickboxing Medals Table

Light-Contact

Light-Contact is a form of kickboxing where the contestants can aim kicks and punches thrown with moderate force at legal targets above the waist.  It is less physical than Full-Contact but more so than Semi-Contact and is often seen as a transitional stage by fighters wishing to eventually move on to fully physical competition.  Most fights are settled by a point's decision although stoppages can occur and like with other forms of amateur kickboxing, head and body protection must be worn.  More information on Light-Contact can be found at the W.A.K.O. website.  At Szeged the men had nine weight divisions ranging from 57 kg/125.4 lbs to over 94 kg/+206.8 lbs while the women had six, ranging from 50 kg/110 lbs to over 70 kg/154 lbs.

While not full of Nnticeable names there were a few stand out winners in Light-Contact with James Stewart and Tonje Sørlie winning two gold medals at the same championships (they would win in Semi-Contact as well) and regular winners Zoltan Dancso, Klara Morton and Nusa Rajher also picking up winners medals.  By the end of the event Hungary were the strongest country in Light-Contact, winning four gold, four silver and two bronze medals.

Men's Light-Contact Kickboxing Medals Table

Women's Light-Contact Kickboxing Medals Table

Semi-Contact

Semi-Contact is a form of kickboxing where the contestants are allowed to punch and kick one another at legal targets above the waist with minimal force being applied.  Almost all matches are settled by a point's decision with the judges scoring on the basis of speed, technique and skill with power prohibited.  Despite the less physical nature of the style, various head and body protection is mandatory.  More information on Semi-Contact can be found at the W.A.K.O. website.  As with Light-Contact the men had nine weight divisions ranging from 57 kg/125.4 lbs to over 94 kg/+206.8 lbs while the women had six, ranging from 50 kg/110 lbs to over 70 kg/154 lbs.

Although not exactly full of glamorous names there were nevertheless several notable winners in Semi-Contact with James Stewart and Tonje Sørlie winning two gold medals at the same championships (they would win in Light-Contact as well) and regular winners Dezső Debreczeni, Gregorio Di Leo (third gold medal in a row) and Luisa Lico also picking up winners medals.  By the end of the championships, as with Light-Contact, Hungary were the strongest nation in Semi-Contact beating stiff competition from Italy, winning three golds, three silvers and two bronze medals.

Men's Semi-Contact Kickboxing Medals Table

Women's Semi-Contact Kickboxing Medals Table

Aero-Kickboxing

Overall medals standing (top 5)

See also
List of WAKO Amateur World Championships
List of WAKO Amateur European Championships

References

External links
 WAKO World Association of Kickboxing Organizations Official Site

WAKO Amateur World Championships events
Kickboxing in Hungary
2005 in kickboxing
Sport in Szeged
2005 in Hungarian sport